Ahmed Ali Al Sayegh (Arabic: أحمد علي الصايغ) is an UAE politician who is Minister of State in the United Arab Emirates since September 2018. He is Chairman of Abu Dhabi Global Market (ADGM), the International Financial Centre in the UAE's capital city.

Early life and education 
Al Sayegh was born in 1962 in Abu Dhabi where he attended school and furthered his higher education in the United States. He graduated in 1983 with a bachelor's degree in Economics from Lewis & Clark College, Oregon, United States.

Career 
In September 2018, the UAE President, Sheikh Khalifa bin Zayed Alnahyan, appointed Al Sayegh as the Minister of State in the UAE Cabinet.

He is Chairman of ADGM, which oversees the UAE capital city's International Financial Centre (IFC). He is the Managing Director of Dolphin Energy, a natural gas company. The company produces and processes natural gas from Qatar's North Field and transports the gas by sub-sea pipeline to the UAE from which it is delivered in the UAE and Oman.

He is Founding Board Member of Etihad Airways and currently serves as a board member. He played an instrumental role in the launch of the UAE's national airline in 2003 and its subsequent growth.

He was the Founding Chairman of Aldar Properties when it launched in 2004 and remained in the role until April 2011.

He was Founding Chairman of Masdar, a renewable energy company based in Abu Dhabi.

He has worked in the UAE state-owned oil company Abu Dhabi National Oil Company (ADNOC).

He has been on a number boards including Chairman of Abu Dhabi Global Market; Deputy Chairman of the Emirates Nature-WWF; Board Member of Etihad Aviation Group; Board Member of Abu Dhabi Development Fund; and Chairman of Al Jazira Investment Company. Former board positions include Deputy Chairman of First Gulf Bank; Founding Chairman of Aldar Properties; Founding Board Member of Mubadala Development Company; Founding Chairman of Abu Dhabi Future Energy Company (Masdar); Founding Board Member and Managing Director of Emirates Foundation; Founding Board Member of Abu Dhabi Water & Electricity Authority; Founding Board Member of Abu Dhabi Ship Building Company; Board Member of Abu Dhabi National Insurance Company; Board Member of Tawazun (formerly UAE Offsets Group); Board Member of Abu Dhabi Tourism Authority; Board Member of Abu Dhabi Education Council; and Board Member of Abu Dhabi Media.

Honours and awards 
ABANA 2017 Achievement Award
London Institute of Banking & Finance (LIBF), Honorary master's degree Award

References 

Living people
Emirati chief executives
People from Abu Dhabi
Emirati people of Iranian descent
Lewis & Clark College alumni
Etihad Airways
1962 births